Shatner may refer to:

 Mordechai Shatner (1904–1964), Zionist activist and a signatory of the Israeli declaration of independence
 William Shatner (born 1931), Canadian actor, recording artist, and author
 Melanie Shatner (born 1964), television and movie actress, daughter of William Shatner